is a Japanese manga artist. Most of her works are based on stories from other media, notably video games. She usually draws girls round-faced, and tends to use warm color tones.

Works
Air
Ark (based on the song of the same name by the Japanese band Sound Horizon)
Kashimashi: Girl Meets Girl
Love Allergen
Magical Play
Roman (based on an album by Sound Horizon)
Yumeria

External links
 Yukipako, Katsura's website 

Manga artists
Living people
Year of birth missing (living people)